Ada is an unincorporated community in Ottawa County, Kansas, United States.  As of the 2020 census, the population of the community and nearby areas was 86.  It is located approximately 12 miles west of Minneapolis.

History
Ottawa County was formed in 1860 and organized in 1866.  A post office was opened in Ada in 1872, and remained in operation until it was discontinued in 1998.

In 1888, a rail line of the Chicago, Kansas and Western Railroad opened from Manchester, Kansas in the east to Barnard in the west, a  line, with a depot in Ada. The Atchison, Topeka and Santa Fe Railway acquired this railroad in 1901.  An application was filed in 1983 to abandon this "Minneapolis District" line.The Minneapolis District, Abandoned Rails, Retrieved 21 February 2022

Demographics

For statistical purposes, the United States Census Bureau has defined Ada as a census-designated place starting with the 2010 census., p. 36 (Ada CDP is listed in 2010 census with population of 100, "X"s are listed for 2000 and 1990 census; the 2000 census does not list an Ada CDP)

Education
The community is served by North Ottawa County USD 239 public school district.

Ada High School was closed through school unification in 1965.  The Ada High School mascot was Wildcats.

References

Further reading

External links
 Ottawa County maps: Current, Historic, KDOT

Unincorporated communities in Ottawa County, Kansas
Unincorporated communities in Kansas